The 2007 Al Hillah bombings killed 200  people, mostly Shia Muslims on a pilgrimage, on 6 March 2007 in Al Hillah, Iraq.

Two suicide bombers wearing explosive vests joined the huge crowds surging into the city for a traditional religious festival. The attack was just one of a few on a particularly bloody day for Iraq as almost 200 people were killed throughout the country.

See also
 2007 suicide bombings in Iraq

References

2007 murders in Iraq
Mass murder in 2007
Suicide bombings in Iraq
Terrorist incidents in Iraq in 2007
Islamic terrorist incidents in 2007
Violence against Shia Muslims in Iraq
Hillah
March 2007 events in Asia